André Beteille, is an Indian sociologist, writer and academician. He is known for his studies of the caste system in South India. He has served with educational institutions in India such as Delhi School of Economics, North Eastern Hill University (in Shillong), and Ashoka University.

Early life and education 
Beteille was born to a French father and an Indian mother. He received his undergraduate and graduate degrees in anthropology from the University of Calcutta. Thereafter he received his doctorate from the University of Delhi. After a brief stint at the Indian Statistical Institute as a research fellow, he joined the faculty of sociology at the DSE.

Career 
He has taught at distinguished universities including Oxford University, Cambridge University, the University of Chicago, and the London School of Economics. He has also served as the Chairman of the Centre for Studies in Social Sciences, Calcutta and of the Indian Council of Social Science Research.

He was a Professor of Sociology at the Delhi School of Economics at the University of Delhi where, since 2003, he remains Professor Emeritus of Sociology. He was appointed National Research Professor by the Government of India in 2007.

Presently, he is the Chancellor of North Eastern Hill University, Shillong, Meghalaya  and prior to that he served as the Chancellor of Ashoka University.

Awards and recognition 
He is a recipient of the third highest civilian honour of India, the Padma Bhushan, and was also made a Fellow of the British Academy (FBA). He also served on the Social Sciences jury for the Infosys Prize in 2010.

Bibliography
Sociology: Essays on Approach and Method, Oxford University Press, 2002.
Antinomies of Society: Essays on Ideologies and Institutions, Oxford University Press, 2000.
Chronicles of Our Time, Penguin Books, 2000.
The Backward Classes in Contemporary India, Oxford University Press, 1992.
Social and Cultural Reproduction of Caste, Kinship and Occupation in India, 1991.
Society and Politics in India: Essays in a Comparative Perspective, Athlone Press, 1991 (L.S.E. Monographs in Social Anthropology, no. 63).
The Idea of Natural Inequality and Other Essays, Oxford University Press, 1983 (new, enlarged edition, Oxford University Press, 1987).
Inequality Among Men, Basil Blackwell, 1977 (Italian edition published as La diseguaglianza fra gli uomini, Il Mulino, 1981).
Studies in Agrarian Social Structure, Oxford University Press, 1974.
Six Essays in Comparative Sociology, Oxford University Press, 1974 (enlarged edition published as Essays in Comparative Sociology, Oxford University Press, 1987).
Inequality and Social Change, Oxford University Press, 1972.
Castes: Old and New, Essays in Social Structure and Social Stratification, Asia Publishing House, 1969.
Caste, Class and Power: Changing Patterns of Stratification in a Tanjore Village, University of California Press, 1965.

Essays
 Secularism Re-examined 
 Race & Caste
 Teaching & Research
 Teaching and Research, Andre Beteille 
 Government & NGOs

References

External links

 Interviewed by Alan Macfarlane 1 June 1986 (video)
 Andre quits the knowledge commission - CNN-IBN news report
 A long view of two Indian social scientists

1934 births
Living people
Indian sociologists
Indian people of French descent
Emeritus Professors in India
Academic staff of Delhi University
Recipients of the Padma Bhushan in literature & education
Corresponding Fellows of the British Academy
20th-century Indian social scientists
Jawaharlal Nehru Fellows